Great Video Hits of The Judds is a video album by American country music duo The Judds. It was released in 1990 by RCA Nashville. It was the duo's second video album released in their career and their second to sell over 500,000 copies in the United States. The album contained the duo's music videos released from the RCA label.

Background, content and release
By 1990, The Judds were among country music's most popular duo's. Prior to this, the pair had several number one hits, five successful studio albums and several concert tours. Up to this point, the duo had released four music videos as well, which were seen on Country Music Television and MTV. Great Video Hits of the Judds contained all four of these music videos in chronological order: "Mama He's Crazy," "Love Is Alive," "Grandpa (Tell Me 'Bout the Good Ol' Days)" and "Give a Little Love." All of these singles had been number one hits on the Billboard country singles chart. The music itself for all four videos was originally produced by Brent Maher. The video collection itself was directed by Mark Pleasant.

Great Video Hits of The Judds was released in 1990 via Curb and RCA Records. It was issued as a VHS and was their first video collection for the label. In June 1990, the video release sold over 500,000 copies, helping it to certify gold from the Recording Industry Association of America. It was The Judds' second video album to achieve a gold certification from the RIAA.

Track listing

Personnel
All credits are adapted from the liner notes of Great Video Hits of The Judds.

 Stephen Buck – producer
 Camille Engel – design
 Martin Fischer – producer
 Robert K. Glassenberg – senior producer
 Mary Hamilton – art direction
 David Hogan – director
 Brent Maher – music producer
 David Naylor – producer
 Ellen Parker – design
 Mark Pleasant – video compilation director
 Bud Schaetzle – director
 Small Wonder Studio – production

Certifications

Release history

References

1990 video albums
The Judds video albums
RCA Records video albums